Kargino is a rural locality (a selo) in Kabansky District, Republic of Buryatia, Russia. The population was 89 as of 2010. There is 1 street.

Geography 
Kargino is located 6 km northwest of Kabansk (the district's administrative centre) by road. Kabansk is the nearest rural locality.

References 

Rural localities in Kabansky District